Nevio Skull (23 December 1903 – 3 May 1945) was a Fiuman Italian businessman and politician from Rijeka (now Croatia). From his father, Skull inherited the property of the "Foundry and factory machines of Matthew Skull", founded in Rijeka in 1878 and quickly became the largest private industry in the city before being taken over in 1935. After 1943 Skull was approached by emissaries of the Yugoslav Partisans, who attempted to convince him to support the annexation of the city of Rijeka to the Democratic Federal Yugoslavia. Skull rejected these proposals, and with the surrender of Italy in World War II, a group of citizens issued a Liburnia Memorandum in which it was recommended that an Italian confederate state be formed from the free cantons of Rijeka (Fiume), Sušak (Sussak) and Ilirska Bistrica (Bisterza), with a planned condominium with the islands of Krk (Veglia), Cres (Cherso) and Lošinj (Lussino).

Death
On the night of 3–4 May 1945, following the Yugoslav occupation of Rijeka, Skull was arrested by agents of OZNA and disappeared as part of the Fiume Autonomists purge. His body was found on the riverbed of the Rječina 25 days later with a gunshot wound to the neck.

See also
List of solved missing person cases
List of unsolved murders

References

Sources

1903 births
1940s missing person cases
1945 deaths
20th-century Italian politicians
Businesspeople from Rijeka
Deaths by firearm in Yugoslavia
Formerly missing people
Italian murder victims
Male murder victims
Missing person cases in Yugoslavia
People murdered in Yugoslavia
Politicians from Rijeka
Unsolved murders in Europe